CMS Helmets (Capacetes Mário Santiago) a Portuguese brand of motorcycle helmet owned by CMS Helmets - Fabrica de Capacetes. This brand is sold globally and is a sponsor of motorcycle races in Portugal and abroad.

External links

Motorcycle Helmets Review
Review At Webbikeworld.com

Motorcycle helmet manufacturers
Manufacturing companies of Portugal
Portuguese brands